George Pollard House is a property in Franklin, Tennessee, United States, that was listed on the National Register of Historic Places in 1988. It was built or has other significance as of c.1845. It includes Central passage plan and other architecture.

The property was covered in a 1988 study of Williamson County historical resources.

References

Central-passage houses in Tennessee
Greek Revival houses in Tennessee
Houses completed in 1845
Houses in Franklin, Tennessee
Houses on the National Register of Historic Places in Tennessee
National Register of Historic Places in Williamson County, Tennessee